Phyllostachys parvifolia is a running bamboo with thick culms that grow tall for a bamboo that endures cold weather.

Description
New culms are dark green, paling with age, 
with a white ring appearing under each node.
Branches are short and leaves are small for a bamboo of the genus Phyllostachys.
Culm sheath colors of purple-red or brown fade or stripe into light colors of tan or yellow-white further up.
Like water bamboo, the rhizomes and roots of this species have air canals as an adaptation for living in wet soil.

Distribution
This bamboo grows in areas ranging from subtropical to temperate and tolerates winter temperatures down to 
being a more cold hardy bamboo.
Its natural distribution in Asia is limited primarily to Zhejiang Province
of China, where it is cultivated.
Due to difficulties in propagation, availability in cultivation is limited.

Name
Its common name Anji golden bamboo refers to Anji County of Zhejiang Province. The specific epithet parvifolia'' means "small-leaved".

Usage
This species is grown mainly for edible shoots, while the culms have general purpose uses.
Harvested moderately early, the shoots are of excellent flavor.

References

parvifolia
Endemic flora of China
Flora of Zhejiang
Grasses of China
Plants described in 1980